The 1998–99 British Collegiate American Football League season was the 14th full season of the BCAFL, organised by the British Students American Football Association (BSAFA, now the BAFA).

Changes from last season
Divisional Changes
There were no changes to the Divisional setup

Team Changes
There were no team changes, meaning the BCAFL stayed at 27 teams.

Regular season

Northern Conference, Scottish Division

Northern Conference, Eastern Division

Northern Conference, Central Division

Southern Conference, Eastern Division

Southern Conference, Central Division

Southern Conference, Western Division

Playoffs

Note – the table does not indicate who played home or away in each fixture.

References

External links
 Official BUAFL Website
 Official BAFA Website

1998
1999 in British sport
1998 in British sport
1999 in American football
1998 in American football